The 2022–23 Segunda Federación season will be the second for the Segunda Federación, the new fourth highest level in the Spanish football league system. Ninety teams will participate, divided into five groups of eighteen clubs each based on geographical proximity. In each group, the champions automatically promoted to Primera Federación, and the second to fifth placers will play promotion play-offs. The last five teams in each group will be relegated to the Tercera Federación; in addition, the four worst teams classified 13th in their group will play play-offs to define the last two relegation places.

Overview before the season
A total of 90 teams will join the league: ten relegated from the 2021–22 Primera División RFEF, 53 retained from the 2021–22 Segunda División RFEF and 27 promoted from the 2021–22 Tercera División RFEF.

Teams relegated from 2021–22 Primera División RFEF

 Atlético Sanluqueño
 Betis Deportivo
 Costa Brava
 Sevilla Atlético
 Tudelano
 UCAM Murcia
 Valladolid Promesas
 Zamora

Teams retained from 2021–22 Segunda División RFEF

 Alzira
 Antequera
 Arenas
 Arenteiro
 Atlético Mancha Real
 Avilés
 Bergantiños
 Brea
 Burgos Promesas
 Cacereño
 Cádiz B
 Compostela
 Coria
 Coruxo
 Cristo Atlético
 Don Benito
 Ebro
 El Ejido
 Espanyol B
 Formentera
 Gernika
 Gimnástica Segoviana
 Hércules
 Ibiza Islas Pitiusas
 Izarra
 Langreo
 Laredo
 Leganés B
 Lleida Esportiu
 Logroñés B
 Mar Menor
 Marino Luanco
 Melilla
 Montijo
 Mutilvera
 Navalcarnero
 Peña Deportiva
 Prat
 Racing Rioja
 Rayo Cantabria
 Real Sociedad C
 Recreativo Granada
 San Juan
 San Roque Lepe
 Sestao River
 Socuéllamos
 Tarazona
 Terrassa
 Teruel
 Unión Adarve
 Vélez
 Villanovense
 Xerez Deportivo

Teams promoted from 2021–22 Tercera División RFEF

 Alavés B
 Alcorcón B
 Alfaro
 Arnedo
 Atlético Madrid B
 Atlético Paso
 Atlético Saguntino
 Beasain
 Cartagena B
 Cirbonero
 Deportivo Aragón
 Diocesano
 Gimnástica Torrelavega
 Guadalajara
 Guijuelo
 Juventud Torremolinos
 Mallorca B
 Manresa
 Olot
 Ourense CF
 Oviedo Vetusta
 Polvorín
 Recreativo
 Utebo
 Utrera
 Valencia Mestalla
 Yeclano

Administrative promotions
 Cerdanyola del Vallès 
 Estepona

Groups

Group 1

Teams and locations

League table

Results

Group 2

Teams and locations

League table

Results

Group 3

Teams and locations

League table

Results

Group 4

Teams and locations

League table

Results

Group 5

Teams and locations

League table

Results

Ranking of 13th-place teams

Notes

See also
2022–23 La Liga
2022–23 Segunda División
2022–23 Primera Federación
2022–23 Tercera Federación

References

 

 
2022-23
4
Spain